Private First Class Joe M. Nishimoto (February 21, 1919 – November 15, 1944) was a United States Army soldier. He is best known for receiving the Medal of Honor because of his actions in World War II.

Early life 
Nishimoto was born in California to Japanese immigrant parents. He was a Nisei, which means that he was a second generation Japanese-American.

He was interned at the Jerome War Relocation Center in Arkansas, following the signing of Executive Order 9066.

Soldier
Nishimoto joined the US Army in October 1943.

Nishimoto volunteered to be part of the all-Nisei 100th Infantry Battalion.  This army unit was mostly made up of Japanese Americans from Hawaii and the mainland.

For his actions in November 1944, Nishimoto was awarded the Army's second-highest decoration, the Distinguished Service Cross.  He was killed in action on November 15, 1944.

Medal of Honor citation
Nishimoto's Medal of Honor recognized his conduct in frontline fighting in France in 1944.

Private First Class Nishimoto's official Medal of Honor citation reads:

See also

List of Medal of Honor recipients for World War II

References

External links
 "Army Secretary Lionizes 22 World War II Heroes" at Defense.gov
 

1919 births
1944 deaths
United States Army soldiers
United States Army Medal of Honor recipients
United States Army personnel killed in World War II
American military personnel of Japanese descent
Japanese-American internees
People from Fresno, California
World War II recipients of the Medal of Honor